Sheikh Sahil (born 28 April 2000) is an Indian professional footballer who plays as a midfielder for I-League club Mohammedan, on loan from Indian Super League club Jamshedpur.

Club career

Mohun Bagan
Sahil started his career at Mohun Bagan academy. As a young player he took part various youth tournaments and leagues with Mohun Bagan. He also played in the U-16 I-League as a part of Mohun Bagan youth team.  He first came on limelight in youth development league organised by IFA and Zee Bangla, though his team was the runners up in the tournament.

Professional career
In the tournament, he showed his potentiality and skills and as a result he was signed by the then coach Kibu Vicuna in the senior team on a four-year deal. He was a dependable man in 2019–20 season for Mohun Bagan. He won the I-League in the 2019 season for Mohun Bagan.

He was chosen by Kibu Vicuña for the 2019–20 Calcutta Football League. Sahil made his Durand Cup debut on 2 August 2019 against Mohammedan. His team won the match 2–0.

On 30 November 2019, he made his I-League debut against Aizawl as substitute in the second half replacing Britto PM. He made his full league debut against Gokulam on 16 December; a match that Mohun Bagan would win 2–1.

Career statistics

Club

Honours
Mohun Bagan
I-League: 2019–20

ATK Mohun Bagan
Indian Super League runner-up: 2020–21

References

2000 births
Living people
Indian footballers
Association football midfielders
Mohun Bagan AC players
ATK Mohun Bagan FC players
Footballers from Kolkata